is the term used for a number of traditional Japanese hairstyles considered to be distinctive in their construction and societal role.

Traditionally, the construction of most  hairstyles consisted of two "wings" at the side of the head, curving upwards towards the back of the head to form a topknot or ponytail, with a long loop of hair below this also drawn into the topknot. Styles were accessorised with traditional hair accessories, though typically only by women; the combination of both style and accessories formed hairstyles that distinctively varied based on gender, age, job role and social standing.

History

Many hairstyles now labelled  were developed during the Edo period, when a preference amongst women for long, flowing hairstyles transitioned towards more elaborate, upswept styles, featuring buns at the back of the neck and 'wings' at either side of the head. This trend, originating amongst courtesans and kabuki actors, soon spread to fashionable merchants' wives, before becoming a general fashion trend seen throughout Japan.

During this time, a number of widely-varying hairstyles were developed and worn by Japanese women, with hairstyles commonly worn based on age, social class and occupation. The  experienced wide popularity, and was commonly depicted in ukiyo-e prints by artists such as Utamaro.

The boxwood and bamboo combs used to create the hairstyles were, and continue to be, handmade by craftspeople; however, though as many as 200 craftspeople made combs near Osaka in the mid-19th century, few craftspeople exist to produce traditional combs in the modern day.

During and after WWII, wigs (known as ) being worn by geisha; this allowed geisha to go weeks without needing to restyle their hair, over the once or twice weekly required when not wearing a wig. The hairstyles worn by  also changed following WWII, though  continued to mostly use their own hair instead of a wig. Previously,  had worn hairstyles relatively similar to the  style worn by geisha, with each section of the hairstyle appearing longer and less voluminous in style.

In the present day, there are still relatively few traditional hairstylists, with just five in 2004 in Kyoto servicing the entirety of the geisha and  communities.

Styling
Though a number of different hairstyles exist, most  styles follow a relatively similar construction method. Knowledge of the styling methods for as many as 115 different styles of  survives to the present day.

The hair is first divided into five sections:

The front, or 
The two sides, or 
The bun/topknot section, called the 
The section forming the long loop of hair underneath the topknot, called the 

Separate hair combs, featuring small, short teeth, are used to gently touch up the hairstyle once styled, keeping it free from dirt and dust.

Geisha
Post-WWII, geisha began to wear wigs (known as ) instead of styling their own hair, a trend which continues to this day. Geisha  are styled to suit each individual's face, meaning that no two geisha  appear alike, whereas bridal  are typically rented and pre-styled, leading to less variation than is seen in the  geisha wear.

Brides

The  worn by brides is typically a pre-styled wig hired for the day, featuring full, rounded , a  set relatively high on the head, a fuller  and a shorter, fuller  at the back. This is usually worn with a set of matching hair accessories, which can be gold, silver, tortoiseshell or faux-tortoiseshell.

wear a number of different hairstyles throughout their apprenticeship to become geisha, many of which vary by region and individual geisha district. The hair accessories worn by  vary by season and occasion, and are considerably larger than most  worn by women. Some  are particular to a certain district or event; for instance,  from Gion Kobu wear a special hairstyle for the Miyako Odori.

Typically, the average  will go through five changes in hairstyle throughout their apprenticeship. These are:

 – the hairstyle worn by every senior  during the Gion Matsuri. It is said that this hairstyle was created using the  hairstyle from the Edo period.
 – the default hairstyle for senior . As  graduate in seniority, the colour of the  changes from red, then to pink, and then finally different colours.
 – the last hairstyle worn by  before graduating to geishahood.  is worn for two weeks before graduation (known as ). It is the most elaborate and expensive of  hairstyles, decorated with formal tortoiseshell , and a unique  designed by the  herself, featuring auspicious animals such as cranes and tortoises.
 – the hairstyle worn by junior  for the first 2–3 years of their apprenticeship. The  appears structurally similar to the  hairstyle, with the  hairstyle featuring a flatter ,  that taper towards the bottom, a smaller, chunkier  and a  that lies further towards the back of the head in its fullness.

The  is formed by shaping a typical -style , before being split into two wings with a long strip of waxed hair. A  hair ornament is placed in the middle of the wings, before two padded rolls of -dyed red silk – known as a  – are inserted at the top and bottom, giving the appearance of a donut-shaped red ring with two wings of hair on either side.

and 

These included, but were not limited to:

, an informal style worn by lower-ranking courtesans, and not seen on townswomen or samurai women in the Edo period as in some hairstyles
, similar to the  worn by senior  and differing in the longer, looser  and in the style of  used
, named after one of the heroines in the Tale of Genji, featuring wide  and a gold cord wrapped around the intricately-styled 

Other styles worn by  had less-elaborate counterparts commonly worn by townswomen,  and women of the samurai class. These included:

Other 
Other Japanese hairstyles include:

See also
 Hairstyles of Japanese women
 List of hairstyles

References

External links
 
 How to style  (in Japanese)

Geisha
Hairstyles by culture
Japanese words and phrases